Wang Po-jung (born 9 September 1993), nicknamed "The King (Dawang)",  is a Taiwanese professional baseball outfielder for the Hokkaido Nippon-Ham Fighters of Nippon Professional Baseball (NPB). He previously played for the Lamigo Monkeys of the Chinese Professional Baseball League (CPBL) from 2015 through 2018.

Career

Lamigo Monkeys

During his rookie season with the Lamigo Monkeys of the Chinese Professional Baseball League (CPBL) in 2016, Wang broke a number of league records. Among them, he became the first player to record 200 hits in the league and finished with a .414 batting average. In 2017, he batted .407 and led the CPBL with 31 home runs. He is one of the greatest Taiwanese hitting talents ever.
On September 3, 2016, Wang became fastest CPBL player (122 games) to reach 200 career hits. On October 10, 2016, he became first CPBL player to record 200 hits in a single season, breaking Wilton Veras' prior record of 176 set in 2009. He finished the year with an unprecedented .414 batting average.

On October 17, 2018, Lamigo announced it intended to post Wang after the Taiwan Series, on November 4. This made Wang the first player to be posted in league history. On November 20, The Lamigo Monkeys accepted the posting fee from the Hokkaido Nippon-Ham Fighters, which gave the Fighters the rights to negotiate to Wang for the next 30 days.

Hokkaido Nippon-Ham Fighters
On December 7, 2018, Wang Po-jung signed with the Fighters, agreeing to a three-year contract.

International career
He was selected for the Chinese Taipei national baseball team at the 2014 U-21 Baseball World Cup, 2014 Asian Games, 2015 Summer Universiade, 2015 WBSC Premier12, 2017 Asia Professional Baseball Championship, 2019 WBSC Premier12, and 2023 World Baseball Classic.

He was also selected as a member of a CPBL All-Stars team for a 2017 exhibition game against the Japan. Playing on February 28, 2017, Wang hit a two-run home run against Nippon Professional Baseball strikeout champ Takahiro Norimoto as part of a 3-for-3, three RBI effort. The next day he had a base hit in two at-bats against Yomiuri Giants ace Tomoyuki Sugano.

References

External links
, or CLBL, or NPB

1993 births
Living people
Asian Games medalists in baseball
Asian Games silver medalists for Chinese Taipei
Baseball players at the 2014 Asian Games
Hokkaido Nippon-Ham Fighters players
Lamigo Monkeys players
Medalists at the 2014 Asian Games
Nippon Professional Baseball left fielders
People from Pingtung County
Taiwanese expatriate baseball players in Japan
2015 WBSC Premier12 players
2019 WBSC Premier12 players